Philip Neil Best (born 15 June 1968) is an English industrial musician, visual artist, and author. A pioneer of power electronics, he formed the band Consumer Electronics in 1982 at age 14.

Best joined the group Whitehouse, in 1983. After a nine-year hiatus starting in 1984, Best rejoined and remained with the group until departing again in 2008.

Career

Music
In the early 1980s, Best also ran his own DIY label Iphar, releasing compilations of power electronics. Through the circulation of these controversial cassettes he succeeded in promoting the burgeoning extreme noise genre. Among these cassette releases were On to 83, with Gary Mundy. Torture Music by Iphar Clinic, a solo project, and White Power, a fake neo-nazi compilation album with artists such as Maurizio Bianchi, Sutcliffe Jügend, and Best's other project with Mundy, Consumer Electronics.

Best has been a frequent collaborator with Gary Mundy on projects such as Ramleh and Skullflower.
In 1995, under the Consumer Electronics moniker, Best joined forces with Japanese noise musician Masami Akita – along with several Ramleh cohorts – to release Horn of the Goat.

Best continues to tour and release music as Consumer Electronics. The current line up includes Best, Russell Haswell and Best's wife Sarah Froelich. Their most recent LP, Dollhouse Songs was released by Harbinger Sound in 2015, and the piece "At Any Rate, It's Already Too Late" was released on the Harbinger Sound Sampler compilation in 2017.

Writing
In 1998, Best published his doctoral thesis at Durham University entitled Apocalypticism in the Fiction of William S. Burroughs, J. G. Ballard and Thomas Pynchon, and later received a doctorate in English literature.

In 2016, a 60-page chapbook of writings by Best was published by Amphetamine Sulphate.

Art
In 2010, a collection of Best's artwork entitled American Campgrounds was published by Creation Books, with a foreword written by Peter Sotos.

In December 2016, Infinity Land Press published Alien Existence, a book of over 200 colour reproductions of original artwork by Best, as well as 40 pages of his creative writings, and an extensive interview conducted by Martin Bladh.

References

External links 
  
 
 
 Consumer Electronics website

Living people
1968 births
English experimental musicians
English industrial musicians
English artists
English male non-fiction writers
Whitehouse (band) members
Alumni of Durham University
British noise musicians
Musicians_from_Bristol